Hackney White Heat was an English basketball team from the district of Hackney in London.  The club were members of the top tier of the former National Basketball League before the competition was reformatted into the current English Basketball League.

History
The team originally began as the "B" team of the London Towers, largely consisting of the Towers' under-23 players.  The club joined NBL Division 2 in 1996, and quickly earned promotion to Division 1 in 1998 by claiming 3rd place in the league and the runner-up position in the playoffs.  After a single season in Division 1, they were forced to break away from their link to the Towers, following a ruling banning 'reserve' teams from the division.  The newly independent team competed for a year as the Islington White Heat, and were almost removed again when the NBL rebranded their upper rank as the NBL Conference.  Following an appeal, the team were allowed to continue in the new league, and took the name Inter-Basket London to try and appeal to a wider community. 

The club's time in the short-lived NBL Conference saw little return for their efforts, never finishing above the bottom three.  By the time the English Basketball League was formed in 2003, the club had rebranded themselves again, becoming the Hackney White Heat.  The new league saw new, tougher rules for their upper tier, leaving Hackney no choice but to drop from the new EBL Division 1 into EBL Division 2 before a single game had tipped off.  Further decline was to follow, as they finished next to bottom in Division 2 in 2005, leading to relegation to Division 3.

Season-by-season records

Notes:
From 2000-2003 the NBL Conference operated as the second tier league, ahead of Division One.
In 2003 the NBL was replaced by the EBL, which reinstated Division One as the second tier.

Former players
 Pops Mensah-Bonsu
 Perry Lawson
 Serhat Urkut A.K.A Haribo

References

Basketball teams in England